The 1974 Speedway World Team Cup was the 15th edition of the FIM Speedway World Team Cup to determine the team world champions.

The final took place at Stadion Śląski, Chorzów in Poland. The title was won by England for the fourth consecutive year and fifth time in total. However they previously rode as Great Britain when they had the benefit of using Commonwealth riders  The fifth win took them ahead of Poland (on four titles) and one behind Sweden (on six titles).

Qualification 

 BRITISH ROUND
 11 August
  Ipswich, Foxhall Stadium

 SCANDINAVIAN ROUND
 3 June
  Skien

 CONTINENTAL QUALIFYING ROUND
 9 June
  Bopfingen

 CONTINENTAL QUALIFYING ROUND
 9 June
  Miskolc

+Hungary II replaced Romania

Tournament

 CONTINENTAL SEMI-FINAL
 29 June
  Abensberg

 CONTINENTAL FINAL
 6 July
  Slaný

 WORLD FINAL
 15 September
  Chorzów, Silesian Stadium

World final

See also
 1974 Individual Speedway World Championship
 1974 Speedway World Pairs Championship

References

World Team
Speedway World Team Cup